Skelpin is an Irish folk music group based in San Diego, California. They perform a fusion of Irish Music and Spanish Flamenco, with Middle-Eastern percussion and have toured with this Irish Fusion globally.
Skelpin is associated with the "Greening of the Gaslamp", a movement of increased Irish culture in the San Diego area. Skelpin also performs each year at the World Music Festival on Catalina Island, held near the end of each October.

History
In 2005 Skelpin performed for 3 months (2005/07/01 - 2005/08/31) at Tokyo DisneySea, and returned to Tokyo in 2007 for the annual Irish Music Festival.

Tim Foley also wrote music and played uilleann pipes for the movie Master and Commander: The Far Side of the World. On September 6, 2008, Foley reported that his set of uilleann pipes were stolen from his car while he was house sitting in La Jolla, California.

Skelpin's latest album Trip to Skye was released in October 2009, with the band playing CD release shows around their hometown of San Diego. Co-Produced by the band, Tim Riley and Alan Sanderson, the album includes guest appearances from percussionist David Page and  Matt Hensley of Flogging Molly.

In early 2010, a song from A Trip to Skye, "The View", written by Foley, won Grand Prize in the World Music category of the John Lennon Songwriting Contest.

Skelpin has been nominated in the annual San Diego Music Awards in 2003, 2004, 2005, 2008, 2009 and 2011 in the category of World Music. In September 2010,Skelpin won the San Diego Music Award for "Best World Music Album" for their disc, A Trip to Skye. 

In 2013 Petrie released a solo album, Pocket Venus, with the members of Skelpin, including Foley and Platas as well as honorary member Hensley, on several tracks. The album was nominated for a 2013 San Diego Music Award.

Current members
 Patric Petrie: vocals, fiddle
 Tim Foley: vocals, guitar, uilleann pipes, reed and wind instruments
 Enrique Platas: drums, percussion
 Wesley Forsberg: bass, electric guitar
 Jimmy Patton: flamenco guitar

Friends, former members, and guests
 Matt Hensley: accordion
 Rowshan Dowlatabadi: accordion, middle-eastern percussion
 David Maldonado: bass, flamenco guitar, mandolin, banjo
 Hector Maldonado: guitars, bass, vocals
 John Martin: percussion
 Mike Kent: drums
 Kellen Miller: drums
 Casey Orillion: drums
 Harold Southworth: vocals, percussion
 Steve Peavey: guitar, mandolin
 Richard Tibbits: penny whistle, flute, woodwinds

Discography
 Whiskey Before Breakfast (2002)
 Rua Rojo (2005)
 Trip to Skye (2009)reissued with new cover 2010

References

External links
Skelpin on MySpace
sdmusicawards.com The San Diego Music Awards website
Skelpin on Reverbnation

Musical groups from San Diego